Nargesi (also Romanized as Nargesī) is a village in Pian Rural District, in the Central District of Izeh County, Khuzestan Province, Iran. At the 2006 census, its population was 45, in 7 families.

References 

Populated places in Izeh County